

73001–73100 

|-id=046
| 73046 Davidmann ||  || David Mann (born 1941) is a sample-preparation expert who produced high-quality thin sections of Apollo moon rocks at NASA Johnson Space Center. He has prepared numerous thin sections of rare meteorites for planetary science research, as well as samples for other fields of study including paleontology and petroleum exploration. || 
|-id=059
| 73059 Kaunas ||  || Kaunas, the second largest city in Lithuania with 400,000 inhabitants. It is situated at the confluence of the two largest Lithuanian rivers—the Neris and the Nemunas. Kaunas was first mentioned in written sources in 1361. It was fated to become the temporary capital of Lithuania during 1919–1940. || 
|-id=073
| 73073 Jannaleuty ||  || Janna Leuty (born 1976) is the wife of astronomer Guy Wells. || 
|-id=079
| 73079 Davidbaltimore ||  || David Baltimore (born 1938), an American biologist renowned for his Nobel Prize-winning research and for his vision and leadership as the seventh president of the California Institute of Technology (1997–2006). || 
|}

73101–73200 

|-id=199
| 73199 Orlece ||  || The Orthopedic Learning Centre of the Department of Orthopedics and Traumatology at the Chinese University of Hong Kong was established in 1999. With the mission statement "Learn and Practice to Serve Better", it provides comprehensive medical education to the orthopaedic community locally and internationally. || 
|}

73201–73300 

|-bgcolor=#f2f2f2
| colspan=4 align=center | 
|}

73301–73400 

|-id=342
| 73342 Guyunusa ||  || Michella Jougousa Gununusa (1806–1834) was a native Indian sold by Uruguay for exhibition in France. She was 27 years old when she died in Lyons only a year after her arrival. She and fellow captive Vaimaca had a daughter, born in France. Another of the "last charrás", Tacuabé, took care of the baby and escaped with her to an unknown place. || 
|-id=358
| 73358 Kitwhitten ||  || Kit Whitten (born 1986) is the archivist at the Observatories of the Carnegie Institution for Science. She has tracked down requested archived plates within their plate library in search of precovery NEO observations. || 
|}

73401–73500 

|-id=442
| 73442 Feruglio ||  || Chiara Feruglio (born 1978), an Italian astronomer who obtained her degree in astronomy at the University of Padua in 2003, with a thesis on spectroscopy of Seyfert galaxies. Currently a Ph.D. student at the University of Tor Vergata in Rome, she is studying the properties of accretion onto super massive black holes. || 
|-id=453
| 73453 Ninomanfredi ||  || Nino Manfredi (1921–2004), Italian actor born in Castro dei Volsci, Frosinone. His successes as a stage and film actor include L'impiegato (1959), La ballata del boia (1963) and Nell'anno del Signore (1969). He also directed the films L'avventura di un soldato (1962), Per grazia ricevuta (1971) and Nudo di donna (1981). || 
|-id=465
| 73465 Buonanno ||  || Roberto Buonanno (born 1947), an Italian astronomer who is an expert in stellar evolution and the director of the Rome Observatory. He created the Planetary Sciences team at the OAR and supported research programs devoted to near-Earth objects and to the study of the physical properties of the small bodies of the Solar System. || 
|-id=491
| 73491 Robmatson ||  || Robert D. Matson (born 1962) is an American amateur astronomer and software developer with special interests in planetary science. Besides being a successful meteorite hunter, Matson is internationally recognized for his satellite-tracking software SkyMap. He also found 15 SOHO comets and is credited with more than 200 discoveries of minor planets. || 
|}

73501–73600 

|-id=511
| 73511 Lovas ||  || Miklós Lovas (born 1931), a Hungarian astronomer successful discoverer of astronomical objects. He has discovered 42 supernovae, 5 comets and 2 minor planets in the course of the supernova search program at the Konkoly Observatory between 1964 and 1995. || 
|-id=517
| 73517 Cranbrook ||  || Cranbrook Institute of Science in Bloomfield Hills, Michigan, is an educational institution that was a formative influence for a number of space scientists, astronomers and educators. || 
|-id=520
| 73520 Boslough ||  || Mark Boslough (born 1955) is an American physicist at Sandia National Laboratories. He has computed the most detailed models to date of atmospheric impact phenomena, especially the Tunguska event and the much older impact that produced the Lybian Desert glass found in Egypt. || 
|-id=529
| 73529 Giorgiopalumbo ||  || Giorgio G.C. Palumbo (1939–2018) was an astrophysicist and a professor at the University of Bologna. He advised dozens of students, contributed to the birth of high energy astronomy, and fostered the growth of cosmic ray physics, thus laying the seeds of modern high energy astrophysics and astroparticle projects. || 
|-id=533
| 73533 Alonso ||  || Fernando Alonso (born 1981) is the Spain's most successful Formula One racing driver. With his victory at the 2003 Hungarian Grand Prix he became the youngest winner in the history of Formula One, at just 22 years and 16 days old. His success has spawned "Alonsomania" in Spain. || 
|-id=534
| 73534 Liviasavioli ||  || Livia Savioli (born 1986) is an Italian aerospace engineer. She performed research studies on space debris to preserve the orbital environment for future space missions. She is currently looking further in space, working on an exploration mission towards Mars. || 
|-id=539
| 73539 Carmenperrella ||  || Carmen Perrella (born 1970) is an Italian amateur astronomer devoted to astronomy public outreach and cometary photometry. She lives in the town of Benevento and in 2015 she founded the first astronomical amateur group in her town. Name proposed by A. Boattini and M. Tombelli. || 
|-id=551
| 73551 Dariocastellano || 2003 QV || Dario Castellano (born 1983) holds a Master's degree in Astrophysics and Space Science and a PhD with a thesis related to gravitational waves. He has also been devoted to astronomy public outreach in the town of Benevento, Italy. He is manly interested in comets, variable stars and exoplanets. || 
|}

73601–73700 

|-id=610
| 73610 Klyuchevskaya || 1054 T-3 || Klyuchevskaja is an active 4750-m volcano on the Kamchatka Peninsula in the Russian Far East. || 
|-id=637
| 73637 Guneus ||  || Guneus, from Greek mythology. He was a warrior from Cyphus, and one of the Achaean leaders in the Trojan War. || 
|-id=638
| 73638 Likhanov ||  || Albert Anatolievich Likhanov (born 1935), a famous Russian writer, academician of the Russian Academy of Education, professor at several universities, and founder and head of Russia's largest children's charity fund, Russian Children Foundation. || 
|-id=640
| 73640 Biermann || 1977 RM || Ludwig Biermann (1907–1986), a German astrophysicist who was the first director of the Max Planck Institute for Astrophysics. He made pioneering studies on stellar convection and the solar chromosphere and corona. His 1951 study of the structural changes in the tail of comet C/1942 X1 provided the first evidence of the existence of the solar wind. || 
|-id=670
| 73670 Kurthopf || 1982 QP || Kurt Hopf (born 1952) is a head teacher of the primary school in Hof, Germany. With enthusiasm and expertise he directed the Hof Public Observatory from 1976 until 2003 and has published astronomical articles and educational material for children. The name was suggested by G. and D. Heinlein (Src). || 
|-id=686
| 73686 Nussdorf ||  || The village of Nussdorf (Nußdorf in Landau) situated in Germany's Palatinate region. The village was named after the abundant walnut trees and first mentioned in the year 802. It is well known for its wine-growing tradition and for its pursuit for harmony between nature and culture. || 
|-id=687
| 73687 Thomas Aquinas ||  || Saint Thomas Aquinas, Italian Catholic philosopher and theologian || 
|-id=692
| 73692 Gürtler ||  || Joachim Gürtler (born 1939), a German astronomer who researched and lectured at the Astrophysical Institute of the University of Jena. His main research field was the interstellar medium. He is co-discoverer of the IR carbon dioxide ice band in spectra of molecular clouds. The name was suggested by the first discoverer. || 
|-id=693
| 73693 Dorschner ||  || Johann M. Dorschner (born 1939), a German astronomer who researched and lectured at the Astrophysical Institute of the University of Jena. His main research field was interstellar and circumstellar dust. He established the Jena laboratory astrophysics branch. The name was suggested by the first discoverer. || 
|-id=699
| 73699 Landaupfalz ||  || Landau/Pfalz is a German university town in southern Rhineland-Palatinate, embedded in vineyards and surrounded by wine-growing villages. || 
|-id=700
| 73700 von Kues ||  || Nicholas of Cusa (1401–1464), was a German theologian, mathematician, scholar, experimental scientist and influential philosopher, born near Trier. He stressed the incomplete nature of man's knowledge of god and of the Universe. His paper Perfectio mathematica (1458) anticipates infinitesimal methods. || 
|}

73701–73800 

|-
| 73701 Siegfriedbauer ||  ||  (born 1930) is an Austrian professor emeritus of meteorology and geophysics at the University of Graz. He was Associate Director of the NASA Goddard Space Flight Center and is a full member of the Austrian Academy of Sciences. His research focuses on the atmospheres of Venus, Mars and Titan. || 
|-id=703
| 73703 Billings ||  || Gary W. Billings is a Canadian geophysicist and amateur astronomer in Calgary, Alberta. He discovered five minor planets in 1999. More recently, he has conducted extensive CCD photometry of variable stars in collaboration with observers worldwide. He served as a council member of the AAVSO from 2002 to 2004. || 
|-id=704
| 73704 Hladiuk ||  || Donald W. Hladiuk (born 1957) is a Canadian geologist in Calgary, Alberta. For over 20 years, he has presented sky highlights on a local radio morning show. He has led numerous astronomical expeditions with the Calgary chapter of the Royal Astronomical Society of Canada, of which he has twice been president. || 
|-id=767
| 73767 Bibiandersson ||  || Bibi Andersson (1935–2019), a Swedish screen actress who studied at the legendary Royal Dramatic Theatre School in Stockholm. She became well-known for Wild Strawberries (1957) directed by Ingmar Bergman. In 1963, she received the Silver Bear for Best Actress in Berlin. || 
|-id=769
| 73769 Delphi ||  || The ancient sanctuary of Delphi, considered the centre of the world by the ancient Greek. Delphi lies on the south-west slopes of the Parnassos mountain, in the valley of the river Phokis, and is the most renowned archaeological site in Greece. || 
|-id=782
| 73782 Yanagida ||  || The Japanese village of Yanagida located in the center of Noto peninsula. This village is home of the Yanagida Astronomical Observatory , where this minor planet was discovered. In March 2005, the village and two neighboring towns, Noto and Uchiura, were merged to form a new town. || 
|}

73801–73900 

|-id=819
| 73819 Isaootuki ||  || Isao Otuki (born 1958) became a member of the Miyagi Abukuma Astronomical Society in 1974 and actively popularizes astronomy. || 
|-id=827
| 73827 Nakanohoshinokai ||  || The Nakano Star Gazers Club of Nakano, Tokyo, was founded in 1973. Although Nakano has the brightest night sky in Japan, the members have contributed to many outreach activities in astronomy. || 
|-id=857
| 73857 Hitaneichi ||  || Hiroshi Taneichi (born 1927), a Japanese professor emeritus at Yamagata University, who studied photo-reactions at the Laboratory of Nuclear Science, Tohoku University. He is now a member of the Yamagata Astronomical Society. || 
|-id=862
| 73862 Mochigasechugaku ||  || "Mochigase chugaku" was a junior high school in Mochigase, Japan. It was established in 1956 and closed in 2013. || 
|-id=872
| 73872 Stefanoragazzi ||  || Stefano Ragazzi (born 1954) is a professor at the Milan Bicocca University and director of Gran Sasso National Laboratory INAF. || 
|-id=883
| 73883 Asteraude || 1997 DQ || An "astéraude" is an asteroid discovered by one of the members of the French AUDÉ society (. This minor planet was the first of a series of discoveries made by members of the association, which discovered about 50 asteroids every year since 1997 (Src) || 
|-id=885
| 73885 Kalaymoodley || 1997 EV || Kalayvany Moodley (born 1969), a South African friend of the Italian discoverer Andrea Boattini. Born in Johannesburg, she studied hotel management in Durban, where she currently lives and runs a convention center. || 
|-id=891
| 73891 Pietromennea ||  || Pietro Mennea (1952–2013) was an Italian sprinter, who won a gold medal in the 200-m at the 1980 Moscow Olympics. In 1979, he set a 200-m world record of 19.72s, a record that stood for almost seventeen years. || 
|}

73901–74000 

|-id=936
| 73936 Takeyamamoto ||  || Takeshi Yamamoto (1932–2005) was a Japanese amateur astronomer who studied astronomy under Issei Yamamoto. He devoted himself to educating the general public about astronomy in the city of Moriyama || 
|-id=955
| 73955 Asaka ||  || Asaka is reclaimed land in Koriyama city, Fukushima prefecture. || 
|-id=984
| 73984 Claudebernard ||  || Claude Bernard (born 1931) worked in the French Railways (SNCF) as a train driver. He is an avid solar observer who has gathered visual observations of sunspots and tried to correlate them with terrestrial phenomena. He co-founded the astronomical association of the SNCF. || 
|}

References 

073001-074000